Tatham is a civil parish in Lancaster, Lancashire, England. It contains 47 buildings that are recorded in the National Heritage List for England as designated listed buildings.  Of these, two are at Grade II*, the middle grade, and the others are at Grade II, the lowest grade.  Apart from the small settlement of Lowgill, the parish is rural, containing widespread farms.  Most of the listed buildings are farmhouses, farm buildings and houses.  The other listed buildings include two churches, two boundary stones, a derelict colliery engine house, a public house, and a telephone kiosk.

Key

Buildings

Notes and references

Notes

Citations

Sources

Lists of listed buildings in Lancashire
Buildings and structures in the City of Lancaster